= Near-close near-back vowel =

Near-close near-back vowel may refer to:

- The near-close near-back unrounded vowel [ɯ̽] or [ɯ̞̈] or [ʊ̜]
- The near-close near-back rounded vowel [ʊ]
